Full Throttle is a video game released in 1984 for the ZX Spectrum and MSX. The player races a 500cc Grand Prix motorcycle on any of ten of the world's top racing circuits.

Gameplay 

After selecting a track to race on, the player starts at the back of the grid, with 39 other bikes.  Cornering too quickly will cause a skid, while running off the road slow the bike down, and making contact with another rider forces the bike to a halt, allowing the following riders to stream past the player as the bike gets going again. There are ten circuits in the game, and part of the key to winning is to know the circuit well enough to predict the bends.  There is a practice mode, in which the player rides round the track without any other riders, or the player can choose a race of between one and five laps. The best position achieved is shown at the bottom of the menu-screen, along with the player's time ahead of the second-place man.  As soon as the track or number of laps is changed, this record is reset.

Development 

The game was written by Mervyn Estcourt, creator of Deathchase.

Reception 

Reviews were positive, with CRASH giving it 91% (a CRASH Smash), Your Spectrum rating it at 4/5, and both Computer and Video Games and Sinclair User rating it at 8/10.

References

External links 
 

1984 video games
MSX games
Racing video games
Video games developed in the United Kingdom
ZX Spectrum games